"Danca tago-mago" is a 1991 song recorded by French-Brazilian band Kaoma. Written by Loalwa Braz with amusic by Michel Abihssir, it was released in the summer of 1991 as the first single from their second album Tribal-Pursuit, on which it appears as the first track. It was a hit in Europe, reaching the top ten in France, Belgium, Portugal and the Netherlands, and became Kaom's last hit worldwide.

Charts performance
In France, "Danca tago-mago" debuted at number 44 on the chart edition of 27 July 1991, climbed quickly and reached the top ten three weeks later, peaked for a sole week at number three in its 11th week, and eventually cumulated ten weeks in the top ten and 18 in the top 50. It earned a Silver disc awarded by the Syndicat National de l'Édition Phonographique. "Danca tago-mago" also charted for 13 weeks on the Dutch Single Top 100, starting at number 79 on 13 July 1991 with two consecutive weeks at number eight, its highest position. Additionally, it stayed for nine weeks in Belgium (Flanders), with a peak at number ten, and was a number six hit in Wallonia and Portugal. On the Eurochart Hot 100, it debuted at number 91 on 10 August 1991, reached a peak of number 17 in its sixth week and remained on the chart for a total of 16 weeks.

Track listings

 7" single - France, Netherlands
 "Danca tago-mago" — 3:45
 "Danca tago-mago" (remix radio) — 4:20

 12" maxi - Netherlands, Spain
 "Danca tago-mago" (remix club) — 5:30
 "Danca tago-mago" — 3:45
 "Danca tago-mago" (remix radio) — 4:20

 CD single - Europe
 "Danca tago-mago" (Latine soul remix) — 7:45
 "Danca tago-mago" — 4:09

 CD maxi - Europe
 "Danca tago-mago" (remix club) — 5:30
 "Danca tago-mago" — 3:45
 "Danca tago-mago" (remix radio) — 4:20

Personnel
 Backing vocal — Fatou Niang, Monica Nogueira
 Bass — Roger "Chyco" Dru
 Guitar — Jacky Arconte
 Drums and percussions — Michel Abihssira
 Keyboards — Jean-Claude Bonaventure
 Engineering — Alan Pype

Charts and sales

Peak positions

Year-end charts

Certifications

References

1991 songs
1991 singles
Kaoma songs